Countess of Oxford may refer to:

Agnes of Essex, Countess of Oxford (c. 1151–1212) 
Isabel de Bolebec, Countess of Oxford (c. 1164–1245)
Maud de Badlesmere, Countess of Oxford (1310–1366)
Maud de Ufford, Countess of Oxford (1345/1346–1413)
Philippa de Coucy, Countess of Oxford (1367–1411)
Elizabeth Trussell, Countess of Oxford (1496–1527)
Margery Golding (1526–1568)
Anne Cecil, Countess of Oxford (1556–1588)
Elizabeth Trentham, Countess of Oxford (d. 1612)
Henrietta Harley, Countess of Oxford and Countess Mortimer (1694–1755)
Jane Harley, Countess of Oxford and Countess Mortimer (1774–1824) 
Margot Asquith, Countess of Oxford and Asquith (1864–1945)
Clare Asquith (b. 1951)

See also
 Oxford (disambiguation)
 Earl of Oxford (Count of Oxford)
 County of Oxford